Theophilus Waldmeier (1832 in Basel – 1915) was a Swiss Quaker missionary. Married Susan Bell, eldest daughter of John Bell, at Magdala, Ethiopia on 4 December 1859.

He was held prisoner by Ethiopian King Theodore and later released by General Napier's British troops at the siege of Magdala, Ethiopia in 1868.

He went to Beirut with the British Syrian Mission (which was founded in 1860). He started the Friends' Syrian Mission in 1873, founded Brummana High School in 1873 and the Asfuriya Mental Hospital in 1894. In 1874, he traveled to Europe to seek financial backing from the Society of Friends. British and American Quakers provided support for the Brummana School.

Notes

1832 births
1915 deaths
Swiss Protestant missionaries
Swiss Quakers
Quaker missionaries
Protestant missionaries in Ethiopia
Protestant missionaries in Lebanon
Swiss expatriates in Ethiopia
Swiss expatriates in Lebanon